The Five Crowns, also known as the Five Heavenly Crowns, is a concept in Christian theology that pertains to various biblical references to the righteous's eventual reception of a crown after the Last Judgment. Proponents of this concept interpret these passages as specifying five separate crowns, these being the Crown of Life; the Incorruptible Crown; the Crown of Righteousness; the Crown of Glory; and the Crown of Exultation. In the Greek language, stephanos (στέφανος) is the word for crown and is translated as such in the Bible, especially in versions descending from the King James Version. These five rewards can be earned by believers, according to the New Testament, as "rewards for faithfulness in this life".

Crown of Life

Jesus references this crown when he tells the Church in Smyrna to "not be afraid of what you are about to suffer... Be faithful even to the point of death, and I will give you the crown of life."

Incorruptible Crown
This epistle, written by Paul of Tarsus, deems this crown "imperishable" in order "to contrast it with the temporal awards Paul's contemporaries pursued". It is therefore given to those individuals who demonstrate "self-denial and perseverance".

Crown of Righteousness
These Christians desire intimacy with God.

Crown of Glory

Crown of Rejoicing
The Crown of Rejoicing is also known as the Crown of Exultation, or Crown of Auxiliary. In the New Testament, Paul earns this crown after winning the Thessalonians to faith in Jesus.

See also

Crown of Immortality
Aureolae
Hades in Christianity

References

External links

Judgment in Christianity
Christian soteriology
Christian terminology